Wallasey Grove Road railway station serves the town of Wallasey in Merseyside, England.

History
The station was built on the Wirral Railway's route from Birkenhead Park to New Brighton, opening as a temporary terminus from 2 January to 30 March 1888. Through services via the Mersey Railway Tunnel to Liverpool commenced in 1938, when the London Midland and Scottish Railway electrified the line.

Facilities
The station is staffed, during all opening hours, and has platform CCTV. There is a payphone, a vending machine and a waiting room on platform 1, a booking office, live departure and arrival screens, for passenger information, and each of the two platforms also has a further sheltered waiting area. The station has a free "Park and Ride" car park with 168 spaces, a drop-off point, a cycle rack with six spaces and secure storage for 20 cycles. Both platforms can be easily accessed by separate entrances, which are a  walk apart, without the use of staircases. However, there is no easier access, cross-platform, for passengers with wheelchairs or prams, as other access is by staircase only.

Services
Current service levels are every 15 minutes to Liverpool and New Brighton during Monday to Saturday daytime, and every 30 minutes at other times. These services are all provided by Merseyrail's fleet of Class 507 and Class 508 EMUs.

Wallasey Grove Road has been adopted by the Edible Wirral Partnership for the growing of fresh fruits and vegetables on the station's platforms.

Gallery

References

Sources

External links

Railway stations in the Metropolitan Borough of Wirral
DfT Category E stations
Former Wirral Railway stations
Railway stations in Great Britain opened in 1888
Railway stations served by Merseyrail
Wallasey